Johan Robert Selfelt (22 May 1903 – 24 August 1987) was a Swedish Army officer and horse rider. He competed at the 1948 Summer Olympics and won an individual bronze and team silver medals in eventing.

Selfelt became major in the reserve in 1949.

Awards and decorations
Knight of the Order of the Sword
Knight of the Order of Vasa

References

1903 births
1987 deaths
Swedish Army officers
Swedish event riders
Olympic equestrians of Sweden
Swedish male equestrians
Equestrians at the 1948 Summer Olympics
Olympic silver medalists for Sweden
Olympic bronze medalists for Sweden
Olympic medalists in equestrian
People from Töreboda Municipality
Knights of the Order of the Sword
Knights of the Order of Vasa
Medalists at the 1948 Summer Olympics
Sportspeople from Västra Götaland County